Lisa Loeb (born March 11, 1968) is an American singer-songwriter, musician, author and actress. She started her career with the number one hit song "Stay (I Missed You)" from the film Reality Bites, the first number one single for an artist without a recording contract. She achieved two additional top 20 singles with "Do You Sleep?" in 1996 and "I Do" in 1998. Her studio albums include two back-to-back albums that were certified gold; these were Tails and Firecracker.

Loeb's film, television and voice-over work includes guest starring roles in the season finale of Gossip Girl, and two episodes, including the series finale, of Netflix's Fuller House. She also starred in two other television series, Dweezil & Lisa, a weekly culinary adventure for the Food Network that featured her alongside Dweezil Zappa, and Number 1 Single on E! Entertainment Television. She has also acted in such films as House on Haunted Hill, Fright Night, Hot Tub Time Machine 2, and Helicopter Mom.

Loeb has released children's CDs and books; her 2016 children's CD Feel What U Feel won Best Children's Album at the 60th Annual Grammy Awards. Loeb's latest album, A Simple Trick to Happiness, was released in February 2020.

In addition, she has a line of eyewear, and started a non-profit organization that sends under-served children to camp, funded by Loeb's own organic and fair trade coffee, Wake Up! Brew.

Early life and education
Lisa Loeb was born to a Jewish family in Bethesda, Maryland, and was raised in Dallas, Texas, where her parents still reside. Her mother, Gail, was the president of the Dallas County Medical Society Alliance and Foundation, and her father, Peter Loeb, was a gastroenterologist. She has a younger sister, songwriter Debbie Loeb. As a child, Lisa studied piano, but later switched to guitar. She attended The Hockaday School, an all-girls private school. For two years, she had her own radio show on 88.5 KRSM-FM, a 10-watt station licensed to the nearby all-boys St. Marks School of Texas. After graduating from high school in 1986, she attended Brown University, where she graduated in 1990 with a degree in comparative literature.

Music career

Early years and first bands (1980s–1993)
At Brown in the mid-1980s, Loeb and Elizabeth Mitchell formed a band named Liz and Lisa, with future singer/songwriter and classmate Duncan Sheik as a guitarist. The duo released the albums Liz and Lisa (1989) and Liz and Lisa - Days Were Different (1990) independently. After college, bassist Rick Lassiter and drummer Chad Fischer joined the band. After developing a following together, Loeb and Mitchell parted ways a few years after college.

Loeb attended Berklee College of Music in Boston for a session of summer school, and in 1990 formed a full band called Nine Stories. The band, which was named after the book by J.D. Salinger, included Tim Bright on guitar, Jonathan Feinberg on drums, and Joe Quigley on bass. Loeb began working with producer Juan Patiño to make the cassette Purple Tape in 1992. It included the earliest recordings of later popular tracks such as "Do You Sleep?", "Snow Day", "Train Songs", and "It's Over". Loeb sold the violet-colored cassette to fans at gigs and used it as a sonic calling card to industry gatekeepers. She and her band made a recording of her song "Stay (I Missed You)" during the same period.

Loeb developed a following from her solo acoustic performances on the New York City coffeehouse circuit and the rock club circuit. She travelled to cities such as Philadelphia, Los Angeles, and Dallas, but focused mainly on New York City. She played acoustically and with her band in folk and rock clubs, including at CBGB. Loeb performed at music festivals such as the New Music Seminar and South by Southwest.

"Stay (I Missed You)" (1994)

Loeb's big break came through her friendship with actor Ethan Hawke, who lived in an apartment across the street from her in New York City. She told Cosmopolitan that she met Hawke in the NYC theater community where, as she phrased it, "I made music for his plays". Loeb gave Hawke the Juan Patiño-produced version of "Stay (I Missed You);" he in turn gave it to director Ben Stiller during the making of the 1994 film Reality Bites. Stiller subsequently decided to use the song in the film's ending credits, and it was included by Ron Fair on the soundtrack on RCA Records. Hawke directed a rare one-take video on film, a continuous steadicam shot operated by Robin Buerki.

"Stay (I Missed You)" went on to become a number one hit on the American charts. When her song hit number one, Loeb earned the distinction of being the first artist to top the Hot 100 before being signed to any record label. The single reached Gold status on July 12, 1994, just over three months after its release date. Loeb and Nine Stories received a Grammy nomination for Best Pop Performance by a Group, and were named Best International Newcomer in the Brit Awards.

In 2019, Loeb released a limited edition 12" red vinyl pressing of the song for the 25th anniversary of the song. The release included four unreleased versions of "Stay (I Missed You)", "Truthfully", "Waiting for Wednesday", and "I Do", recorded live in January 2013 in Japan.

Loeb appeared at the 25th anniversary screening of Reality Bites at the Tribeca Film Festival, with the film's stars Ethan Hawke, Winona Ryder, Ben Stiller, and Janeane Garofalo, and performed "Stay (I Missed You)" during the film's end credits.

Tails and Firecracker (1995–1999)

In September 1995, Loeb's debut album, Tails, credited to Lisa Loeb & Nine Stories, was released on Geffen Records. The album was co-produced by Juan Patiño, her then longtime boyfriend. "Stay" was included on the album, and Loeb managed a top 20 hit with "Do You Sleep?" and two moderately successful radio hits with "Taffy" and "Waiting for Wednesday". The album was certified Gold by the RIAA on December 1, 1995. Critics were favorable to the album, with Ken Tucker of Entertainment Weekly, in particular, noting, "Loeb has an undeniable gift for creating an air of intimacy and vulnerability, which may well be enough for 'Stay' fans looking for additional doses of contemplative melancholy".

After the release of Tails Tim Bright and Jonathan Feinberg left Nine Stories and were replaced with Mark Spencer and Ronny Crawford respectively.

In 1997, Loeb released a second major-label album on Geffen, Firecracker, and began experimenting more with orchestrations done with Dan Coleman. At this point, Loeb started going under her own name for the albums instead of using the band name, although she still continued to tour worldwide with Nine Stories, as well as acoustically as she had done from the start. Firecracker included hit singles such as "I Do", which received radio success, peaking at #17 on the Billboard Hot 100 and music television. The album was certified Gold on June 10, 2008. She subsequently toured with The Wallflowers and Chris Isaak, and performed at Lilith Fair.

Guest appearances (2000–2001)
In 2000, Loeb participated in the Ozzy Osbourne tribute album Bat Head Soup, performing "Goodbye to Romance" with Dweezil Zappa on guitar. She contributed to An All Star Tribute To Cher with "Gypsies, Tramps and Thieves", and to An All Star Tribute To Shania Twain with "Don't Be Stupid", both of which were released in 2005. Other international work includes Loeb's guest performance on the song "Anti-Hero" for an all-female Japanese musical group Rin''s album Inland Sea. Loeb contributed vocals to New Found Glory's cover of "Stay", from their 2007 LP From the Screen to Your Stereo Part II, as well as performing the song live with the band.

Beginning with Reality Bites, Loeb's music has been featured in several soundtracks. The single "How" was included on the soundtracks for films Twister and Jack Frost, and was heard in the Buffy the Vampire Slayer episode "Homecoming". "We Could Still Belong Together" earned a spot on the Legally Blonde soundtrack in 2001, while "I Wish" can be heard on the soundtrack for Anywhere But Here (1999).

Cake and Pie (2002)

Cake and Pie, Loeb's third album and debut for A&M/Interscope, was released in 2002. She co-produced the album and collaborated with Glen Ballard, then boyfriend Dweezil Zappa, Randy Scruggs (Vince Gill, Sawyer Brown, Waylon Jennings), and Peter Collins (Rush, Bon Jovi, Indigo Girls). It peaked at 199 on the Billboard Charts.

In mid-2002, Loeb signed a deal with Artemis Records, a new boutique label run by record company veterans Danny Goldberg and Daniel Glass, after Interscope allowed her to buy the rights to her masters. Artemis had offered to re-release the record with more promotion. With new artwork, some songs added and some removed, Cake and Pie was re-launched as Hello Lisa, a play on Sanrio's signature Hello Kitty, who appears on the album cover wearing Lisa Loeb's trademark glasses.

She released an EP with just the new songs on it, as well as an alternative version of the song "Underdog" for fans who had already purchased the Cake and Pie CD. She co-directed a video with Dweezil Zappa for "Underdog" co-starring Hello Kitty playing guitar. Loeb toured the world again, making special stops in Sanrio stores for in-store autographs while appearing with Hello Kitty at the Japanese MTV Music Awards.

The Way It Really Is (2004)

In 2003, Loeb voiced the role of Mary Jane Watson in Spider-Man: The New Animated Series, which ran for one season on MTV.

In 2004, Loeb signed to the more experienced and established independent label Zoë/Rounder Records. The Way It Really Is was released August 2004 as Loeb's fifth studio-recorded album, based on the song "The Way It Really Is". Although the album was not as commercially successful as its predecessors, critics noted the mature and strong writing by Loeb. Stephen Erlewine called it "the best, most cohesive record she's made, a clean, crisp collection of well-crafted, gentle tunes that slowly, surely work into the subconscious."

The Very Best of Lisa Loeb, Purple Tape (2006–2009)

Her greatest hits compilation, The Very Best of Lisa Loeb, was released through Universal in January 2006 as well as a Japanese version of the album. Loeb was a judge for the 1st and 8th annual Independent Music Awards to support independent artists.

In 2008, she released her Purple Tape album remixed and remastered on a double CD. It included an interview by Andy Denemark, highlighting the creative process behind each song. There were extensive liner notes and photos documenting her early history in New York City.

No Fairy Tale and touring (2013–2014)
Her seventh studio album No Fairy Tale was released on January 29, 2013, by 429 Records, coproduced by Chad Gilbert and Loeb herself. She released the original single "A Holiday Song" through Furious Rose Productions on December 10, 2013.

Loeb tours with and without her band, touring with Daru Oda and Adam Levy. Other band members include Mark Spencer, Matt Beck, Ronny Crawford, Joe Quigley, Joe Travers, Mark Meadows, Michael Eisenstein, Dave Gibbs, and Leland Sklar. In September 2014, she performed at the Billboard Live venues in Tokyo and Osaka. During the performances she ended with a rendition of her new song "3, 2, 1, Let Go". On December 9, 2014, she released the original single "Light". The Hanukkah song tells a "story of hope in the darkness", and was co-written by Loeb and Cliff Goldmacher, with Renee Stahl on guest vocals. The song was put in rotation on SiriusXM among other stations.

Camp Kappawanna, singles (2015–2019)
She co-wrote the lyrics and co-composed the music to Camp Kappawanna, a family musical that premiered in New York on March 21, 2015, by the Atlantic Theater Company. Other collaborators on the score included Michelle Lewis and Dan Petty. The musical follows "the misadventures of Jennifer Jenkins, an awkward and adorable 12-year-old kid", and was inspired by Loeb's own memories of summer camp. The show received a positive write-up in The New York Times, with the review describing it as "fresh and funny" and praising the acoustic music and characterizations of the campers.

Her song "3, 2, 1, Let Go" was released in April 2015 as a single. Co-written and co-composed with Chris Unck, the song was also used in the April 2015 film Helicopter Mom. Loeb starred in the film as a high school English teacher. On November 20, 2015, Loeb released the single "Champagne (I'm Ready)" as a digital download through Amazon. Loeb described the New Year's track as "something you'd probably hear more in a dance club."

In 2018, Loeb released a special version of the David Bowie song "All the Young Dudes" after performing her version of on a Howard Stern Show tribute to Bowie.

On May 29, 2019, Rolling Stone premiered Loeb's studio-recorded cover of the Bright Eyes song "First Day Of My Life". She previously performed the song at a friend's wedding a decade prior.

In July of the same year, Billboard premiered Loeb's new song "Love Never Dies", an original track she wrote to serve as the theme song to acclaimed author James Patterson's novel, Sophia, Princess Among Beasts, and inspired by the book.

A Simple Trick to Happiness (2020), Together Apart
A Simple Trick to Happiness was released on February 28, 2020. The album is Loeb's most personal and reflects her interest in simple and direct songwriting paired with inspiration from her children and personal life. Loeb was inspired to write positive, uplifting music due to the complexity of modern life and after having written several albums of children's music. In October 2019, Loeb preceded the album's release with the premiere of her single "Sing Out" on the largest LGBTQ news site Queerty, in honor of National Coming Out Day. In December 2019, she premiered the music video for "Skeleton", the first official single from the album.

The album was met by positive from critics. She has subsequently released music videos for many of the tracks on the album, including "This Is My Life", "Another Day", "Sing Out', "For the Birch", "Shine", "The Upside", "Doesn't It Feel Good", "Most Of All", "I Wanna Go First" and "Wonder".

In March 2020, Loeb launched #StayAtHomeTogether, a series of live virtual concerts during the COVID-19 lockdown. She performed a special virtual show for hospital frontline workers through the organization Musicians On Call.

In August 2021, Loeb saw the premiere of Together Apart, a musical consisting of a collection of 10 seven-minute-long mini-musicals all about connecting on Zoom at the beginning of the COVID-19 pandemic. Loeb conceived and executive produced the musical, in which she also stars. Benefiting The Actors Fund, Together Apart was written, composed, directed-by and starring Loeb's fellow Brown University alumni, including Julie Bowen (Modern Family),
Emmy Award Winner Josh Hamilton (13 Reasons Why), Ann Harada (Avenue Q) and JoBeth Williams (Kramer vs. Kramer). It was produced by Tony Award winner Beth Wishnie.

Together Apart evolved out of a Brown Musical Theatre class reunion on Zoom held during the pandemic. The reunion was attended by graduates from the early 80s through the late 90s. Loeb, a ’90 Graduate, was energized by the digital reconnection and was inspired to find a solution to everyone’s concern about how theater could exist during the pandemic. She began collaborating with her fellow graduates to create Together Apart. Together Apart was intentionally created using the Zoom platform as a reflection of life during the pandemic.

Catch the Moon album (2003–2006) 

In 2003, Loeb reunited with her college music partner Elizabeth Mitchell on children's CD and companion book Catch the Moon through Artemis Records. According to Allmusic, "The songs are rendered in a folk/country acoustic minimalism that is, in a word, enchanting." Videos from this album, as well as the single "Jenny Jenkins", have been featured on the Noggin TV network for children.

In 2006, Loeb contributed to the album A World of Happiness, designed to disseminate messages of kindness, compassion, tolerance, and self-reliance to children of all ages. She performed as Lady Leonali the Ladybug singing "In the Details".

Camp Lisa album and non-profit (2008–2010) 

In 2008 she released Camp Lisa, which was also released by Loeb's own Furious Rose Productions with distribution through Redeye, and produced by Loeb with Michelle Lewis and Dan Petty. The disc includes a mix of 21 original and classic camp songs and guest performers including Kay Hanley, Dave Gibbs, Nina Gordon, Jill Sobule, Lee Sklar, Maia Sharp, and funnyman/banjo player Steve Martin.

As Loeb spent many summers of her childhood at summer camp, Camp Lisa is inspired by her camp memories as well as 1970s-style rock and pop. Camp Lisa garnered National Parenting Publications Awards Honors, 2008 Parents' Choice and NPR's year-end Top 10 list of the best kids' music for 2008. In July 2010, she debuted her children's musical Camp Kappawanna, which is based on the songs from Camp Lisa.

In conjunction with Camp Lisa, she launched her own non-profit, The Camp Lisa Foundation, designed to help underprivileged kids attend summer camp through its partnership with SCOPE (Summer Camp Opportunities Promote Education, Inc.). In 2009, The Camp Lisa Foundation provided funding for many camp scholarships, enabling economically disadvantaged children to attend ACA-accredited overnight camps.

Lisa Loeb's Silly Sing-Along album and book (2011) 
In September 2011, Loeb released Lisa Loeb's Silly Sing-Along: The Disappointing Pancake and Other Zany Songs, illustrated by Ryan O'Rourke. The book was published by Sterling Publishing, and also includes activities, choreography, and recipes. The book is published with an included CD, with four original songs and six classics.

===Movin' and Shakin''' book (2013)===
In April 2013, Loeb released the children's book Lisa Loeb's Songs for Movin' and Shakin': The Air Band Song and Other Toe-Tapping Tunes, which she co-wrote with Ryan O'Rourke. It includes both covers and some original songs, as well as a CD. The adult album No Fairy Tale was also released in 2013 in North America, after a 2012 release in Japan.

Nursery Rhyme Parade! album and videos (2015)

Loeb's third children's album, Nursery Rhyme Parade!, was made available  exclusively through Amazon Music on October 16, 2015. The album includes 35 nursery rhymes and songs, including renditions of "The Muffin Man" and "The Farmer in the Dell".
 Beyond Loeb and her family as performers, guest artists included singer-songwriter Renee Stahl, while Rich Jacques produced. InStyle opined the album would "delight" both children and adults, describing it as having "stripped-down melodies and a strict adherence to traditional lyrics."

Loeb's Nursery Rhyme Parade! won a 2016 NAPPA Award (National Parenting Product Awards).

On December 16, 2016, Loeb released a long-form video of the over 30 songs from Nursery Rhyme Parade!Feel What U Feel album (2016)
In November 2016, Loeb released her fourth children's album entitled Feel What You Feel. She wrote and composed the selections on this album based on "what I'd like to pass along to my kids and kids in general." The title track, "Feel What U Feel", featured Craig Robinson of The Office, and it became the #1 song on SiriusXM's Kids Place Live, on which program it continued to be played as of the last days of August 2017. The parenting site, CoolMomPicks.com, chose "Feel What U Feel" as a 2016 Pick of the Year. On January 28, 2018, Loeb won the 2018 Grammy Award for 'Best Children's Album' for the album.

Give a Mouse a Cookie soundtracks (2016)
When Amazon Studios announced their November 25, 2016 holiday special, If You Give a Mouse a Christmas Cookie, they invited Loeb to contribute music. She recorded "Christmas Cookie Song" to accompany the Amazon Original program. In addition, Loeb wrote the theme song and additional original songs for the If You Give A Mouse A Cookie Amazon series.

Lullaby Girl album (2017)
In October 2017, Loeb released her fifth children's album entitled Lullaby Girl featuring a world-class quartet led by keyboardist Larry Goldings. The album features Lisa and Larry's arrangements of classic songs like Dionne Warwick's "What the World Needs Now Is Love", the Five Stairsteps' "O-o-h Child", and Fleetwood Mac's "Don't Stop.", as well as two new original songs, including the title track. Lullaby Girl won a 2017 National Parenting Product Award.

Film and television appearances
In 1989, Loeb appeared in the low-budget comedy horror anthology film Tabloid, in a segment entitled "Killer Vacuum Destroys Town". The film was shot in and around Fort Worth, Texas.

Loeb shared title billing with then-boyfriend Dweezil Zappa on the reality show Dweezil & Lisa, which premiered on Food Network on January 16, 2004. The series showed the two musicians touring the country together and sampling unique and diverse dishes. In the opening for each episode, Loeb announced she was a vegetarian who enjoyed eating an occasional piece of bacon.

In the fall and winter of 2005, following her breakup with Zappa, Loeb taped a reality show called Number 1 Single, which premiered in January 2006 on the E! Channel in New York City. The show dealt with her quest for love, success, career, and family. A re-recording of Loeb's selection "Single Me Out" was used as the program's theme.

Loeb has made several guest appearances on television shows such as The Nanny in 1997, and Cupid the following year. In September 1999, she made an appearance on the comedy show MADtv, singing the theme song for a WB drama sketch called "Pretty White Kids with Problems". In 2007, Loeb appeared on an episode of Jack's Big Music Show singing the song "Jenny Jenkins". In 2008, she made a guest appearance on Gossip Girl, followed by a cameo on an episode of The Sarah Silverman Program in which the cast formed a mock band called "The Loeb Trotters". On the final episode of Gossip Girl on Monday, December 17, 2012, Lisa ended up with the character Rufus Humphrey in the five years after glimpse.

In addition to television shows, Loeb has also appeared in the horror films House on Haunted Hill (1999), Serial Killing 4 Dummys (1999), and Fright Night (2011). She has done voice work including the voice of Mary Jane Watson for the animated show Spider-Man: The New Animated Series, broadcast on MTV. Loeb also voiced the character of Lutina in the video game Grandia Xtreme and characters for The Rugrats Movie and Shorty McShorts' Shorts. As of 2012, Loeb provided the voice of Princess Winger on the Disney Junior animated series Jake and the Never Land Pirates.In 2008, Loeb was one of the contributors to Carrie Borzillo-Vrenna's book Cherry Bomb; she gave advice on how to be the perfect hostess.

In 2010, Loeb provided guest voices for Disney's Special Agent Oso. In 2012, she provided voice over talent for BonTon industries in their spring TV spots. In December 2012, Loeb made a brief cameo as Matthew Settle's (Rufus Humphrey) love interest in "New York, I Love You XOXO", the final episode of Gossip Girl.In February 2013, Loeb also made a cameo in an episode of Workaholics where her song "Stay (I Missed You)" is referenced several times. In January 2014, Loeb appeared on the cover of Making Music. In April 2014, Loeb appeared in the first episode of Last Week Tonight with John Oliver in a short musical sketch about Oregon's health care website failure.

In 2015, Loeb appeared as Julie, lead singer of the fictitious band "Natalie is Freezing", in "Advanced Safety Features", a season 6 episode of the TV series Community. She also appeared as herself in Hot Tub Time Machine 2. Other shows she has recently been involved in include Orange Is the New Black, About a Boy, King of the Nerds, The Muppet Show, Sunny Side Up Show, and Fuller House.In 2021, Loeb appeared in a GEICO commercial campaign singing her hit “Stay” setup as an audition.

Businesses
According to People: "Though Lisa Loeb rose to fame as a singer, she's probably just as well known for her eyeglasses." In November 2010, Loeb launched the Lisa Loeb Eyewear Collection. Each type of frame is named after one of her song titles, and while most models are for women, there are models for young girls and men.

Loeb also sells a brand of coffee called her "Wake Up! Brew", a reference to her "Everybody Wake Up" song from her Camp Lisa album. The brand is organic and fair trade, with all profits going to Camp Lisa, and it is only available through the Coffee Fool website.

She constructed a crossword puzzle with Doug Peterson for The New York Times, which was published on June 6, 2017.

Personal life
Loeb dated Dweezil Zappa from 1998 to 2004. She married Roey Hershkovitz in 2009; they met in 2006 during a business meeting for a food TV show. The couple have two children, Lyla Rose and Emet Kuli. Her cousin is New York City-based drag queen Alexis Michelle who was a competitor on the ninth season of reality television series RuPaul's Drag Race.

Awards and nominations
{| class="wikitable sortable plainrowheaders" 
|-
! scope="col" | Award
! scope="col" | Year
! scope="col" | Nominee(s)
! scope="col" | Category
! scope="col" | Result
! scope="col" class="unsortable"| 
|-
!scope="row"|She Rocks Awards
| 7th Annual She Rocks Awards|2019
| Lisa Loeb
| Inspire Award
| 
| 
|-
!scope="row"|Grammy Awards
| 2018
| Feel What U Feel| Best Children's Album
| 
| 
|-
!scope="row"|American Camp Association
| 5th Annual Camp Champions Celebration|2015
| Lisa Loeb
| Camp Champions Award
| 
| 
|-
! scope="row" rowspan=2|BMI Pop Awards
| 1996
| "Stay (I Missed You)"
| rowspan=2|Award-Winning Song
| 
| 
|-
| 1999
| "I Do"
| 
| 
|-
!scope="row"|MTV Video Music Awards
| 1994
| "Stay (I Missed You)"
| Best New Artist in a Video
| 
| 
|-
!scope="row"|Brit Awards
| 1995
| Lisa Loeb
| International Breakthrough Act
| 
| 
|-
!scope="row"|Grammy Awards
| 1995
| "Stay (I Missed You)"
| Best Pop Performance by a Duo or Group with Vocals
| 
| 

Discography

Studio albums
1990: Liz and Lisa – Days Were Different (with Elizabeth Mitchell)
1992: Purple Tape (re-released in 2008)
1995: Tails1997: Firecracker2002: Cake and Pie2002: Hello Lisa (re-release of Cake and Pie)
2004: The Way It Really Is2013: No Fairy Tale2017: Lullaby Girl2020: A Simple Trick to HappinessChildren's albums
2003: Catch the Moon2008: Camp Lisa2011: Lisa Loeb's Silly Sing-Along: The Disappointing Pancake and Other Zany Songs (songbook featuring a recording)
2013: Movin' and Shakin (songbook featuring a recording)
2015: Nursery Rhyme Parade!2016: Feel What U FeelPublishing history
Books
2011: Lisa Loeb's Silly Sing-Along: 'The Disappointing Pancake' and Other Zany Songs2013: Lisa Loeb's Songs for Movin' and Shakin'Plays
2021: Together Apart – co-wrote lyrics, co-composed music, stars in, and executive produced
2015: Camp Kappawanna'' – co-wrote lyrics and co-composed music

Filmography

References

External links

 
CoffeeFool.com – Wake Up! Brew

 

 
American women singer-songwriters
American women pop singers
American voice actresses
American television actresses
Participants in American reality television series
Berklee College of Music alumni
Brown University alumni
Brit Award winners
California Democrats
Grammy Award winners
Living people
American children's musicians
Jewish American musicians
Jewish American actresses
Geffen Records artists
A&M Records artists
American radio DJs
Zoë Records artists
Jewish folk singers
20th-century American guitarists
20th-century American women writers
21st-century American women writers
American women radio presenters
Hockaday School alumni
20th-century American women guitarists
1968 births
People from Bethesda, Maryland
Musicians from Maryland
Musicians from Dallas
Singer-songwriters from Maryland
Singer-songwriters from Texas